SNS may refer to:

Science and technology

Biology and medicine
 Somatic nervous system or voluntary nervous system
 Supplemental nursing system, to provide additional milk to a nursing infant
 Sympathetic nervous system, part of the autonomic nervous system

Computing
 Social networking service, social website
 Amazon Simple Notification Service, for mobile devices

Other uses in science and technology
 Spallation Neutron Source, Oak Ridge, Tennessee, US
 US Strategic National Stockpile of medical supplies
 Tin(II) sulfide, SnS

Organizations

Businesses
 SNS Bank, Netherlands
 Street News Service, for street newspapers

Political parties
 Serbian Progressive Party (Srpska napredna stranka)
 Serb People's Party (Srpska narodna stranka)
 Slovak National Party (Slovenská národná strana) (1990–present)
 Slovak National Party (historical) (1871–1938)
 Slovenian National Party (Slovenska nacionalna stranka)

Other organizations
 Scuola Normale Superiore, an Italian higher education institution
Serviço Nacional de Saúde, the Portuguese national health service
 Sistema Nacional de Salud, the national health system of Spain
 Société de natation de Strasbourg, French water polo team
 Special Night Squads, a former Jewish-British military unit
 Stoke Newington School, London, UK

Other uses
 Salinas Municipal Airport, Monterey County, California, US, IATA code
 SNS, the product code used by Nintendo for Super NES hardware (e.g. SNS-001)
 SNS, abbreviation for "Salomon Nordic System", a binding standard for cross country skis